The Arch of Augustus (in French Arc d'Auguste) is a monument in the city of Aosta, northern Italy.

It was erected in 25 BC on the occasion of the Roman victory over the Salassi and was the work of Aulus Terentius Varro Murena.

It is located at the end of the decumanus maximus, a little distance from the Bourg Saint-Ours (quarter of the Collegiate Church of Saint Ursus) and from the eastern entrance of the city wall (the Porta Prætoria).

Description
Its span is a barrel vault,  constituting an extension in width of a round arch.

In the monument, various styles can be recognised: The ten engaged columns which decorate its facade and its sides culminate in Corinthian capitals, while the entablature, adorned with metopes and triglyphs, is of the Doric order.

In the Medieval period, it came to be called the Saint-Voût (French for "Holy Arch") from an image of Jesus which was located in the same place.

During the 12th century, the arch contained the home of a local noble family and in 1318 a small fortification was built inside it, designed for a corps of crossbowmen. In 1716, because of the numerous leaks that were compromising the integrity of the monument, the attic that previously crowned the arch was replaced with a slate roof.

The arch's modern appearance is the result of a final intervention for restoration and consolidation which occurred in 1912 under the direction of Ernesto Schiaparelli.

The wooden crucifix displayed below the vault is a copy of the one which was placed there in 1449 as a votive offering against the flooding of the river Buthier, which flows a little to the east. The original crucifix is now housed in the Museum of Aosta Cathedral's Treasures.

Quotation

See also
 Arch of Augustus (disambiguation) for other such monuments
 List of Roman triumphal arches

References

External links
  The Arch of Augustus on the website of the Autonomous Region Aosta Valley

Ancient Roman triumphal arches in Italy
Buildings and structures in Aosta
Augustus